Pana Hema Taylor (born 1989) is a New Zealand television actor, best known for his roles in Spartacus, The Brokenwood Mysteries and Westside.

Early life

Pana Hema Taylor grew up in the town of Wairoa, where he became involved with the New Zealand street gang, Mongrel Mob. In order to keep him from becoming a gang member, his parents, who had split up awhile before, decided that he should live with his father in Christchurch, New Zealand where he attended Aranui High School. In 2007, he won best actor for his role as Mercutio in the school's production of Romeo and Juliet.

Career
Hema Taylor was first seen on TV in 2007 on the Māori language educational series Whanau. He has since worked on various New Zealand feature films including Boy and Kawa. Hema Taylor is best known for his work in the Starz television series Spartacus: Vengeance and Spartacus: War of the Damned, playing the role of the Syrian rebel Nasir. In 2014 he was cast as Mana in the New Zealand action film The Dead Lands.

He starred as Jared in The Brokenwood Mysteries series 1–6, and as Bert in Westside.

Personal life

In 2009, 20-year-old Hema Taylor met 38-year-old actress Danielle Cormack when she was the costume/set designer on a play he was in. The two have a son, Te Ahi Ka, born 19 March 2010. They divorced in 2013.

In March 2015, Taylor and his partner Naomi Campbell had a daughter.

Hema Taylor is of Māori (Ngāti Kahungunu) heritage.

Filmography

Film

Television

External links 
 
 Pana Hema Taylor - Agent Profile

References

1989 births
Living people
People from Auckland
People from Christchurch
New Zealand male Māori actors
Ngāti Kahungunu people
New Zealand male film actors
New Zealand male television actors
People educated at Aranui High School
21st-century New Zealand male actors